Reality show is a term for a television series in the reality television genre.

"Reality Show" can also refer to the following:

 Reality Show (film), a 2004 documentary film directed by Colin Trevorrow
 Reality Show (album), a 2015 album by Jazmine Sullivan
 Reality Show?, a 2015 album by Taiwanese singer Show Luo
 "Reality Show", a song by T-Pain from the 2008 album Three Ringz
 Reality Show, a 2012 Showtime mockumentary series created by and starring Adam Rifkin, later adapted into the film Shooting the Warwicks